David Comissiong (born 1960) is a Vincentian-born political activist, founder of the Clement Payne Movement, and former head of the Barbadian government's Commission for Pan-African affairs. He is a frequent critic of globalization and United States hegemony. Commissiong is one of the key Pan-Africanists in Caribbean politics.

Biography
David Andre Comissiong was born in 1960 in St. Vincent and the Grenadines. He attended Harrison College in Barbados, and went on to study at the University of the West Indies at Cave Hill (Barbados), then at the Hugh Wooding Law School in Trinidad & Tobago. where was admitted to the bar in 1984.

He starred in the multi-award-winning documentary 500 Years Later (2005), which featured Maulana Karenga, Muhammed Shareef, Francis Cress Welsin, Kimani Nehusi, Paul Robeson Jr, Nelson George, and many others.

Comissiong is the author of the 2013 book It's the Healing of the Nation: The Case For Reparations In An Era of Recession and Re-colonisation. He is also the author of Marching Down the Wide Streets of Tomorrow: Emancipation Essays and Speeches, published in 2008.  

An attorney by profession, he is married with two daughters.

Bibliography 

 Marching Down the Wide Streets of Tomorrow: Emancipation Essays and Speeches, 2008, 

 It's the Healing of the Nation: The Case For Reparations In An Era of Recession and Re-colonisation, 2013, .
 The Pan-African Love Story of Arnold and Mignon Ford, 2020, .

References

Further reading
 "Interview with David Commissiong (Bridgetown, Barbados, September 15, 1998)", in Rodney Worrell, Pan-Africanism in Barbados: An Analysis of the Activities of the Major 20th-Century Pan-African Formations in Barbados, Washington, DC: New Academia Publishing, 2005, pp. 116–19.

External links
 IMDB Profile 
 Stand Firm
 Nation News Paper
 Pan-African Commission

20th-century Barbadian lawyers
21st-century Barbadian lawyers
1960 births
Barbadian activists
Barbadian lawyers
Barbadian pan-Africanists
Clement Payne Movement politicians
Living people
Saint Vincent and the Grenadines emigrants to Barbados